Lomatium torreyi is a species of flowering plant in the carrot family known by the common name Sierra biscuitroot. It is endemic to the Sierra Nevada of California, where it grows in the forests of the high mountains.

Description
Lomatium torreyi is a perennial herb growing up to 30 centimeters tall from a long taproot. There is generally no stem, the leaves and inflorescence emerging at ground level. The leaf blades are divided and subdivided into a mass of threadlike segments. The inflorescence is an umbel of yellow flowers.

External links
 Calflora Database: Lomatium torreyi (Sierra biscuitroot,  Torrey's lomatium)
Jepson Manual eFlora treatment of Lomatium torreyi
USDA Plants Profile for Lomatium torreyi
UC CalPhotos gallery of Lomatium torreyi

torreyi
Endemic flora of California
Flora of the Sierra Nevada (United States)
Taxa named by John Merle Coulter
Flora without expected TNC conservation status